The High Follow-Up Committee for Arab citizens of Israel (also, High Follow-Up Committee for Arab Affairs and High Follow-Up Committee for the Arab Masses in Israel) is an extra-parliamentary umbrella organization that represents Arab citizens of Israel at the national level. It is "the top representative body deliberating matters of general concern to the entire Arab community and making binding decisions." While it enjoys de facto recognition from the State of Israel, it lacks official or de jure recognition from the state for its activities in this capacity. The National Committee of the Heads of Arab Localities (NCALC), the sole non-partisan organization representing the Arab minority in Israel, constitutes the main party in the High Follow-Up Committee (or Follow-Up Committee; its shorthand forms).

Overview
The High Follow-Up Committee was established sometime between 1982 and 1984, after the events of Land Day in 1976. Members are drawn from the Arab heads of local authorities and major Arab organisations and parties in Israel. Because they do not have to submit to direct election and reach decisions by consensus, often leading to paralysis, the committee has been criticized by the community for being unwieldy and ineffective. Jonathan Cook wrote in Al-Ahram Weekly in 2006 that in recent years, there have been calls from Arab political factions for direct elections to be held for the positions in the High Follow-Up Committee, but that, "the Israeli government has intimated that it would consider an Arab 'parliament' as an attempt at secession and react harshly."

Many resolutions have been passed since the establishment of the committee. Notable among these are many declarations calling for the holding of general strikes to protest Israeli policies, and a number of these have been successfully observed.

Manifesto
The High Follow-Up Committee and NCALC published their first manifesto, The Future Vision of the Palestinian Arabs in Israel, in December 2006. The document calls for Israel to be transformed from a Jewish state that privileges its Jewish majority into "a state of all its citizens". It also calls for radical reforms to the national system of land allocation and development, which the authors charge is designed to exclude Palestinian citizens from influence.

Membership
The Chairman of the High Follow-Up Committee is Mohammad Barakeh.

See also
 Arab Higher Committee

References

Bibliography

External links
 Palestinian leaders in Israel declare strike, call for boycott
 High Follow-up Committee for Arab Citizens of Israel to the Prime Minister: Arab citizens will oppose all illegitimate, racist legislative bills such as the proposal to ban commemoration of the Nakba

Political organizations based in Israel
Palestinian politics